Judas Tree is a common name for a flowering tree, Cercis siliquastrum from which Judas Iscariot is reputed to have hanged himself.

Judas Tree may also refer to:

 Other flowering tree species in the genus Cercis
 The Judas Tree, a 1961 novel by A. J. Cronin
 The Judas Tree (ballet), by Kenneth MacMillan
 "The Judas Tree" (Jonathan Creek), an episode of Jonathan Creek